Hypatopa vox is a moth in the family Blastobasidae. It is found in Costa Rica.

The length of the forewings is about 4.8 mm. The forewings are brown intermixed with pale-brown scales. The hindwings are translucent pale brown.

Etymology
The specific name is derived from Latin vox (meaning voice).

References

Moths described in 2013
Hypatopa
Moths of Central America